Long'an is a town in Luocheng Mulao Autonomous County, Guangxi, China.

Administrative division
As of 2021, the town is divided into one community and sixteen villages: 
Long'an Community 
Pingshi 
Beiyuan 
Tianbao 
Wuhua 
Dameng 
Taihe 
Gao'an 
Lianhua 
Longfeng 
Longping 
Shankou 
Sipan 
Zhujiang 
Rongshan 
Sanling 
Balian

History
Long'an District was set up in 1925 during the Republic of China. It was incorporated as a township in 1933.

In 1968, it was renamed "Long'an People's Commune" and reverted to its former name of "Long'an Township" in 1984. In January 1993 it was upgraded to a town.

Geography
It is located on the northeast of Luocheng Mulao Autonomous County, bordering Baotan Township to the west, Huangjin to the south, Rongshui Miao Autonomous County to the north and east.

The Xiaoqing River flows through the town.

The Dongkan Reservoir is the largest reservoir in Luocheng Mulao Autonomous County. 

The Bangdong Reservoir is a reservoir in the town, providing drinking water and water for irrigation.

Climate

Economy
The economy of the town has a predominantly agricultural orientation, including farming and pig-breeding. The main crops are rice and corn. Economic crops are mainly sugarcane and cassava.

Demographics

The 2019 census reported the town had a population of 54,934.

Tourist attractions
The Former Residence of Li Deshan is a popular attraction, in memory of Li Deshan, one of the 72 martyrs in the Second Guangzhou Uprising.

There are two Buddhist temples in the town: Qingshan Temple and Anning Temple. Qingshan Temple is a Buddhist temple in the town with a history of over 1,000 years. Anning Temple is also a Buddhist temple and originally built in 1589, during the ruling of Wanli Emperor of the Ming dynasty (1368–1644).

References

Bibliography

 

Divisions of Luocheng Mulao Autonomous County